Two Days in the Life of... is an album by the saxophonist Warne Marsh, recorded in 1987 and released on the Interplay label.

Reception 

AllMusic states: "This was one of tenor saxophonist Warne Marsh's last records. Fortunately his musical talents were unimpaired and he sounds in prime form".

Track listing 
All compositions by Warne Marsh except where noted.
 "Initially K.C." – 8:08
 "Geraldyne's Arrangement" – 6:45
 "All God's Chillun Got Rhythm" (Bronislaw Kaper, Walter Jurmann, Gus Kahn) – 5:09
 "Blues Warne-ing" (Ron Escheté) – 4:10
 "Asterix" – 9:45
 "Jason's Judgement" – 5:35
Recorded at Backroom Recording Studio, Sherman Oaks, CA on June 4, 1987 (tracks 1 & 3) and June 5, 1987 (tracks 2 & 4–6)

Personnel 
Warne Marsh – tenor saxophone
Ron Escheté – guitar
Jim Hughart – bass
Sherman Ferguson – drums

References 

Warne Marsh albums
1987 albums
Interplay Records albums